Soon-hee, also spelled Sun-hui, is a Korean feminine given name. Its meaning differs based on the hanja used to write each syllable of the name. There are 31 hanja with the reading "soon" and 24 hanja with the reading "hee" on the South Korean government's official list of hanja which may be used in given names. According to South Korean government data, it was the ninth-most popular name for newborn girls in Korea in 1940.

People with this name include
Han Sun-hi (born 1955), North Korean archer
Boo Soon-hee (born 1967), South Korean sport shooter
Kim Soon-hee (born 1977), South Korean weightlifter
Kye Sun-hui (born 1979), North Korean judoka
Ho Sun-hui (born 1980), North Korean football midfielder and referee
Soon Hee Newbold, South Korean-born American composer, conductor, musician, and actress

Fictional characters with this name include:
Kim Soon-hee, female protagonist in 1980s North Korean film series Unsung Heroes

See also
List of Korean given names

References

Korean feminine given names